"It's 'Cause I Am" is a song by American country music singer Callista Clark. It was released on March 29, 2021 as lead single from her debut album Real to Me: The Way I Feel. Clark wrote the song, along with Cameron Jaymes and Laura Veltz. "It's 'Cause I Am" was produced by Nathan Chapman.

Background
Real to Me, Callista Clark's debut EP, was released on February 12, 2021, with the impact date for "It's 'Cause I Am" to country radio set for March 29, 2021. "It's 'Cause I Am" was written on December 16, 2019 in Nashville by Clark, Cameron Jaymes and Laura Veltz at Jaymes' backyard studio "The Garden Shed". Clark told Taste of Country that the track was "about someone telling you that you can't do something", and that "it's always been a special song to me, and it's the one song that I thought people my age could really relate to". In an interview with Sounds Like Nashville, Clark said that she wrote the song after an encounter with a man in a Starbucks who saw her with a guitar and said "pfft, good luck", with Clark saying the song was addressed to "anybody who made me feel small or less than I was", and it was her way of "putting them back in their place a little and boosting my confidence".

Critical reception
Forbes Rianna Turner called "It's Cause I Am" an "unapologetic declaration of confidence", comparing it to other "empowering country woman hits" such as "Man! I Feel Like a Woman!" and "Girl". In a piece for Billboard, Tom Roland said that the song's "staggered phrasing, the rock-edged chords and the confident conclusion" were similar to a Bonnie Raitt song, and that Clark's timbre is "older than her chronological age", comparing it to LeAnn Rimes in the 1990s.

Commercial performance
Released to US country radio as a single on March 29, 2021, the song first appeared on the Billboard Country Airplay chart at number 60, on the chart dated for April 3, 2021. The song has since risen to a peak of number 20 on that chart. Clark claimed on June 8, 2021, that the song had received one million streams on Spotify. As of June 10, 2021, Spotify's artist page for Clark lists "It's 'Cause I Am" as having 1,060,021 streams.

Music video
A music video for "It's 'Cause I Am" was released on June 4, 2021, directed by Audrey Ellis Fox. Clark said of the video that "I couldn’t be more excited to release my first music video! This is the kind of thing I’ve always dreamed about. Being on set and watching it come to life was surreal."

Credits and personnel

 Callista Clark − lead vocals, background vocals, composition, lyrics
 Nathan Chapman − production, acoustic guitar, bass guitar, electric guitar, mixing
 Cameron Jaymes − composition, lyrics
 Laura Veltz − composition, lyrics
 Aaron Sterling − drums
 Kevin Kadish − electric guitar
 Brian David Willis − engineer
 Dave Cohen − keyboards
 Ted Jensen − mastering engineer
 Jeff Balding − recording engineer

Charts

Release history

References

2021 debut singles
Callista Clark songs
Songs written by Laura Veltz
Song recordings produced by Nathan Chapman (record producer)
Big Machine Records singles
2021 songs